The Southern Environmental Center is an environmental educational facility located on the campus of Birmingham-Southern College in Birmingham, Alabama.  Each year, hundreds of school children tour the facility's Interactive Museum and EcoScape.

External links
Southern Environmental Center

Museums in Birmingham, Alabama
Birmingham–Southern College
Science museums in Alabama
University museums in Alabama
Natural history museums in Alabama
Nature centers in Alabama